Tasia Sherel (born July 23, 1978) is an American actress and model, best known for starring as Francis in Showtime TV series Dexter and as Pam in Everybody Hates Chris.

Biography
Sherel was born in 1978 and raised on the south side of Chicago, Illinois. She never intended to pursue a career in entertainment. She studied cosmetology in her local community college. While working toward her degree, Sherel took a job at a Hair Care Company as an assistant. One day, they asked her to fill in for a no-show model and after that, she kept booking jobs realizing that she enjoyed the work.

Career
She then won the prestigious title of Miss Mahogany Chicago and went on to place in the Top 10 of a national pageant. Her biggest break came at the Maybelline Modeling Competition, hosted by the national make-up company of the same name. After winning the competition, she was approached and represented by agent Dee Simmons. She decided to take Simmons advice and began her acting career in New York City.

Filmography

Film

Television

References

External links

1978 births
Living people
African-American actresses
21st-century American actresses
American film actresses
American television actresses
American female models
Actresses from Chicago
Female models from Illinois